Beautiful Youth is a 2014 Spanish-French drama film directed by Jaime Rosales. It was selected to compete in the Un Certain Regard section at the 2014 Cannes Film Festival where it won a commendation from the Ecumenical Jury.

Plot
A young Spanish couple lives in Madrid with their mothers, in dilapidated apartments and within days of chatter and boredom. In the absence of money and prospects, when they discover her pregnancy, they decide to shoot an amateur porn film.

Cast

Accolades

See also 
 List of Spanish films of 2014
 List of French films of 2014

References

External links
 

2014 films
2014 drama films
Spanish drama films
2010s Spanish-language films
Films about financial crises
Films set in Madrid
Films about pornography
2010s Spanish films
French drama films
2010s French films